Prof. Ezri Tarazi (born 1962, in Ezra Tarazi, Jerusalem) Israeli industrial designer and educator (1986–90). Tarazi studied industrial design at the Bezalel Academy of Art and Design in Jerusalem. Subsequently, he was a coordinator of instructors' education for leadership in the Maritime Academy of the Israeli Navy. Early employment included serving as the project manager of industrial-design projects at Bezalel R&D in Jerusalem in 1990–96, and was active as a freelance designer in 1993–96. 1996–2004, he was the head of the Department of Industrial Design at the Bezalel Academy and, 2004–12, founded and chaired the Bezalel master's-degree program in industrial design. 

Tarazi has been active as a professional designer for a number of clients who produce a range of high-tech and office equipment and devices and, on an experimental level, for domestic goods. 1998–2000, he was a partner of IDEO Israel (an affiliate of IDEO California), now disbanded. In 2006–12, he was director of d-Vision, the design studio in Israel, where Keter Plastic products are designed. From 1992 and for over a decade, Tarazi has written on design issues for a number of publications, including for Haaretz newspaper in Tel Aviv. His best-known work is the 2005 "New Baghdad" table produced by Edra of Milan, Italy.

Established in 1996, the Tarazi Design Studio is located in Tel Aviv.

References
 Byars, Mel (2003). Design in Steel, London: Laurence King. |  
 Byars, Mel (2004). The Design Encyclopedia, New York: The Museum of Modern Art, p. 732. |  
 Byars, Mel (2006). New Chairs: Design, Materials, and Technology, San Francisco: Chronicle Books. |

External links
 Tarazi Design Studio website
 d-Vision website

1962 births
Living people
Bezalel Academy of Arts and Design alumni
Israeli industrial designers